You're Darn Tootin' is a silent short subject directed by E. Livingston Kennedy starring comedy duo Laurel and Hardy. It was released on April 21, 1928, by Metro-Goldwyn-Mayer.

Plot
Members of a municipal band, Stanley and Oliver seem to be always following someone else's lead, rather than that of the temperamental conductor. Soon they're out of a job, as well as their lodgings when the landlady finds out they've been fired. The boys try their luck at being street musicians, but the tiffs they get into with each other soon spread to passersby in general, until the street is filled with men pulling each other's pants off.

Cast

Production notes
You're Darn Tootin''' was filmed in January 1928. The title is an American idiomatic phrase akin to "You're darn right!" The film was originally released in the UK under its working title The Music Blasters. The film was directed by fellow film comedian Edgar Kennedy (billed as "E. Livingston Kennedy").

Scenes from You're Darn Tootin were included in several silent film compilations of the 1960s produced by Robert Youngson.

The film was shown on the BBC Four programme Paul Merton's Silent Clowns in full with an original, unique musical score.

Reception
Laurel and Hardy: The Magic Behind the Movies  author Randy Skretvedt wrote positively about You're Darn Tootin''', saying the film "is the first clear statement of the essential idea inherent in Laurel and Hardy. The world is not their oyster: they are the pearls trapped in the oyster. Their jobs hang by rapidly unraveling threads. Their possessions crumble into dust. Their dreams die just at the point of fruition. Their dignity is assaulted constantly. At times they can't live with each other, but they'll never be able to live without each other. Each other is all they will ever have. That, and the hope for a better day — which is about the most profound philosophical statement ever to come from a two-reel comedy."

British film critic Leslie Halliwell commented, "...though early in their teaming [it] shows Stan and Ollie at their best in a salt shaker routine and in a surreal pants-ripping contest."The Laurel & Hardy Encyclopedia author Glenn Mitchell contrasts the expanding-mayhem finale with earlier scenes, saying the film "contains what is in many respects the best of Laurel & Hardy's huge street battles. So good is this climactic sequence that other sections tend to be ignored: the opening bandstand segment is timed to a musical beat...."

Bruce Calvert of Allmovie commented that the film "is famous for the pants-ripping scene at the end, but the other parts of it are just as funny.... The final pants-ripping scene is not funny just because so many men lose their pants, but because Laurel and Hardy come up with inventive ways to pull more innocent bystanders into the fray."

Writing in the 1960s, The Films of Laurel and Hardy author William K. Everson appraised the film, saying "The boarding house [dinner] is a charming sequence with Hardy's fruitless efforts to charm and cajole the landlady.... The shin-kicking, pants-ripping finale is one of their best and most meticulously constructed sequences of controlled savagery, similar to and in many ways better than the great pie fight [of The Battle of the Century]."

The Sons of the Desert
Chapters, called Tents, of The Sons of the Desert, the international Laurel and Hardy Appreciation Society, all take their names from L&H films; the You're Darn Tootin' Tent is in Mobile, Alabama.

References

External links
 
 
 
 

1928 films
1928 comedy films
American silent short films
American black-and-white films
Laurel and Hardy (film series)
Metro-Goldwyn-Mayer short films
Films with screenplays by H. M. Walker
1920s American films
Silent American comedy films